Tremotylium is a genus of lichen-forming fungi in the family Graphidaceae. The genus was circumscribed by Finnish lichenologist William Nylander in 1865, but it was not published validly. He validated the genus and assigned T. angolense as the type species in 1868.

Species
Tremotylium africanum 
Tremotylium angolense 
Tremotylium australiense 
Tremotylium sprucei

References

Ostropales
Lichen genera
Ostropales genera
Taxa described in 1865
Taxa named by William Nylander (botanist)